Moïse Bombito Lumpungu (born 30 March 2000) is a Canadian soccer player who plays as a central defender. He was drafted third overall by Colorado Rapids in the 2023 MLS SuperDraft.

Early life
From Montreal, he attended École Secondaire Saint-Laurent. He played youth soccer with CS St-Hubert where he began as a striker before developing into a central defender. Bombito began his collegiate career at Iowa Western Community College with whom he won the NJCAA National Championship in 2021. 
Bombito then studied at the University of New Hampshire where he was named the 2022 America East Defender of the Year and a second-team all-American selection.

Career
Bombito played for the Seacoast United Phantoms in the USL League Two as they won the Northeast Division of the Eastern Conference in 2022 and was named in the 2022 USL2 team of the year. Bombito was selected third overall in the 2023 MLS SuperDraft by the Colorado Rapids. This made him the first player from the University of New Hampshire to be selected in the first round of the draft.  Bombito described it as “a dream
come true”. 
He was awarded a Generation Adidas contract.

Career statistics

References

 Living people
 2000 births
USL League Two players
Seacoast United Phantoms players
Canadian soccer players
Association football defenders
New Hampshire Wildcats men's soccer players
Soccer players from Montreal
Colorado Rapids draft picks
Iowa Western Reivers men's soccer players
Canadian expatriate sportspeople in the United States
Colorado Rapids players